Belarusian rock has been developing since the early 1980s. The rock bands include Mroja (later renamed to N.R.M.), Daj Darogu!, Kriwi, Lyapis Trubetskoy, Verasy, Open Space, Neuro Dubel, Accent, and Otrazhenie. 

Metal bands are Asguard and TT-34. Basovišča is a Belarusian rock music festival. Other festivals in the field were "Be Free" and "Rock-kola".

Censorship
There is another side to Belarusian music life which is censorship. Researchers Maya Medich and Lemez Lovas reported in 2006 that "independent music-making in Belarus today is an increasingly difficult and risky enterprise", and that the Belarusian government "puts pressure on ‘unofficial’ musicians - including ‘banning’ from official media and imposing severe restrictions on live performance." 
In a video interview on the  website, the two authors explain the mechanisms of censorship in Belarus.

Another black list became known in 2011, when Krama, Krambambula, Lyapis Trubetskoy, N.R.M., Naka, Palats, Neuro Dubel among others were banned from performing concerts in Belarus.

Notable festivals
Basovišča (held in Poland)
Be Free (held in Ukraine)
Rock-kola
Slavianski Bazaar in Vitebsk

Notable bands

Alternative rock:
N.R.M.
Termin X
Weesp
 Zolki Band

Black metal:
Infestum

Christian rock:
 Spasenie

Death metal:
Asguard

Doom metal:
Reido

Folk rock:
Krambambula
Kriwi

Folk rock VIA:
Pesniary
Syabry

Folk metal:

Evoking Winds

Hard rock/Heavy metal:
Accent
Otrazhenie

Indie rock:
Bi-2
Bristeil
Jitters
Hair Peace Salon
Martin S.

Pop rock:
beZ bileta
Open Space

Post-metal:
Nebulae Come Sweet

Punk rock:
Daj Darogu!
Brutto
Lyapis Trubetskoy
Messed Up
Mister X
Neuro Dubel

Rapcore:
TT-34

References

External links
Lemez Lovas and Maya Medich: 'Hidden Truths – Music, Politics and Censorship in Lukashenko’s Belarus' (Freemuse Report no. 7)
Articles on music censorship in Belarus
Vector Ego Official Website

Rock
Belarus